The Ministry of Women, Child Affairs and Social Empowerment is the Sri Lankan government ministry responsible for "Formulating, executing and regulating provisions and policies aligned to practices of good governance to ensure the rights of children and women by empowering socio-economic conditions, instilling values and ensuring participation through strategic integration with all stakeholders leading to a dignified nation".

Overview

Vision:

Mission:

List of ministers

The Minister of Women, Child Affairs and Social Empowerment is an appointment in the Cabinet of Sri Lanka.

Parties

History

See also
 Ministries of Sri Lanka

References

External links
 Ministry of Women & Child Affairs and Social Security
 Government of Sri Lanka

Women and Child Affairs and Social Security
Women and Child Affairs and Social Security
Sri Lanka
Women in Sri Lanka
Women's rights in Sri Lanka